The threadfin shad (Dorosoma petenense) is a small pelagic fish common in rivers, large streams, and reservoirs of the Southeastern United States. Like the American gizzard shad, the threadfin shad has an elongated dorsal ray, but unlike the gizzard shad, its mouth is more terminal without a projecting upper jaw. The fins of threadfin shad often have a yellowish color, especially the caudal fin. The back is grey to blue with a dark spot on the shoulder. D. petenense is more often found in moving water, and is rarely found deep in the water column. It occurs in large schools, sometimes with gizzard shad, and can be seen on the surface at dawn and dusk. This fish is very sensitive to changes in temperature and dissolved oxygen, and die-offs are frequent in late summer and fall, especially when water temperature drops to 42°F.  The threadfin shad is a favorite food for many game fishes, including striped bass, largemouth bass, smallmouth bass, and catfish. This fish is widely introduced throughout the United States as a forage for game fish.

Geographic distribution
The threadfin shad is native to the U.S., west of the eastern Appalachian Mountains. This species tends to do best in large lakes and rivers. The construction of dams has created more reservoirs, providing more water bodies for the shad to inhabit. This has expanded the home range of the fish, as has the rise in temperatures in northern lakes.

Ecology
The adult may reach up to 8 in long, but most shad are about 1 in long. It feeds on plankton near the surface of the water late in the day. It is a very important food source for many game fish such as the largemouth bass. It has little known competition, but one species known to have a similar lifestyle is the gizzard shad (Dorosoma cepedianum). The threadfin lives a pelagic life in reservoirs and for the most part in large streams.

Life history
The shad spawns in the spring when the water temperature is in the upper 60s (°F). A pelagic (open water) schooling species often introduced as a supplemental forage, threadfin shad spawn in the spring and early summer with a secondary spawn often occurring in the early fall. Spawning usually occurs early in the morning on available vegetation. The eggs adhere to submerged and floating objects. Females lay from 2,000 to 24,000 eggs. The young and adults feed on a variety of planktonic organisms and organic debris. Many researchers believe that threadfin shad often compete for plankton with young-of-the-year predator species, especially largemouth bass. Life expectancy seldom exceeds 2 to 3 years.

Current management
Many populations of threadfin shad have been introduced by humans to the far north, resulting in large die-offs in the winter when water temperatures fall below 42°F. This die-off affects both humans and wildlife. A tide of dead fish floats ashore, creating a strong odor unpleasant to humans. The die-off also gives some bird species an unnatural feeding habit, as well. The species should not be transplanted into water bodies that drop below 42°F. This species is not endangered and has relatively healthy populations.

References

External links

Clupeidae
Fish of North America
Fish described in 1867
Taxa named by Albert Günther
Freshwater fish of North America